Feichang was a figure in Chinese mythology.

In the Records of the Grand Historian, Sima Qian's account of the origins of the House of Ying state that Feichang was the great-great-grandson of Ruomu, one of the sons of Fei the Great (also known as Boyi).

References 

Shang dynasty people
Characters in Chinese mythology